The Alton Railroad  was the final name of a railroad linking Chicago to Alton, Illinois; St. Louis, Missouri; and Kansas City, Missouri. Its predecessor, the Chicago and Alton Railroad , was purchased by the Baltimore and Ohio Railroad in 1931 and was controlled until 1942 when the Alton was released to the courts. On May 31, 1947, the Alton Railroad was merged into the Gulf, Mobile and Ohio Railroad. Jacob Bunn had been one of the founding reorganizers of the Chicago & Alton Railroad Company during the 1860s.

Main lines included Chicago to St. Louis and a branch to Kansas City. The former is now part of Union Pacific, with Metra Heritage Corridor commuter rail service north of Joliet (owned by the Canadian National Railway but used by UP). Today, the Kansas City line is part of the Kansas City Southern Railway system.

History 
The earliest ancestor to the Alton Railroad was the Alton and Sangamon Railroad, chartered February 27, 1847, in Illinois to connect the Mississippi River town of Alton to the state capital at Springfield in Sangamon County. The line was finished in 1852, and as the Chicago & Mississippi Railroad extended to Bloomington in 1854 and Joliet in 1855. Initially trains ran over the completed Chicago and Rock Island Railroad to Chicago.

The Joliet and Chicago Railroad was chartered February 15, 1855, and opened in 1856, continuing north and northeast from Joliet to downtown Chicago. It was leased by the Chicago & Mississippi, providing a continuous railroad from Alton to Chicago. In 1857 the C&M was reorganized as the St. Louis, Alton and Chicago Railroad, and another reorganization on October 10, 1862, produced the Chicago and Alton Railroad. The C&A chartered the Alton and St. Louis Railroad to extend the line to East St. Louis, opened in 1864, giving it a line from Chicago to East St. Louis.

In 1925 Chicago & Alton carried 2143 million revenue ton-miles of freight and 202 million revenue passenger-miles on (at year-end) 1056 miles of road and 1863 miles of track. Same numbers for 1944 were 2596, 483, 959 and 1717. By 1950, all of the Alton's steam locomotives were replaced by diesel locomotives.

Railroad family tree

Kansas City line

Springfield-Kansas City and Godfrey-Roodhouse
Gateway Western Railway 
1997–present Gateway Western is a Kansas City Southern Railway subsidiary
1990-1997 Gateway Western was an affiliate of the Atchison, Topeka and Santa Fe Railway
Chicago, Missouri and Western Railway 1987-1989

Chicago-St. Louis line
Union Pacific Railroad 1996–present  Chicago-St. Louis line
SPCSL Corporation 1989-1996 a subsidiary of Southern Pacific Transportation Company
Chicago, Missouri and Western Railway 1987-1989

Early years of Alton
Chicago, Missouri and Western Railway 1987-1989
Illinois Central Gulf Railroad 1972-1987
Gulf, Mobile and Ohio Railroad 1947-1972 
Alton Railroad  1931-1947 Subsidiary of Baltimore and Ohio Railroad
Chicago and Alton Railroad 1906-1931 took over line from Peoria-Springfield
Chicago and Alton Railway 1900-1906 controlled by UP & Rock; later NKP
Chicago and Alton Railroad 1861-1900
Kansas City, St. Louis and Chicago Railroad 1878-1950 leased by Alton RR  Mexico-Kansas City
Louisiana and Missouri River Railroad 1870-1950 leased by Alton RR Louisiana-Springfield, Missouri
Joliet and Chicago Railroad 1864-1950 leased by Alton RR Joliet – Chicago
St. Louis, Alton and Chicago Railroad c.1857-1861 Alton – Joliet
Alton and Sangamon Railroad 1847-c.1857 Springfield – Alton

Passenger service notables

The first sleeping car designed by George Pullman was built in the C&A's Bloomington shops and introduced on September 1, 1859, on the Chicago-St. Louis route. Sleeping cars were operated over most routes between Chicago, Peoria, Bloomington, St. Louis and Kansas City in principal train consists. Successor Gulf, Mobile & Ohio operated Chicago-St. Louis sleeping car service until December 31, 1969, the last railroad to do so between the two cities.

The first dining car, the Delmonico, named for the famous New York restaurant, was built by Pullman in the Aurora, Illinois, shops of the Chicago, Burlington & Quincy. The car first appeared in regular service over the C&A's Chicago-St. Louis mainline. Two other Pullman diners built at the same time, the Tremont, and the Southern, were leased, providing dining car service on all three principal C&A Chicago-St. Louis trains. Dining cars were a part of Chicago-St. Louis train consists until May 1, 1971, with the takeover of passenger service by Amtrak.

In 1932 the Alton was the first Chicago-St. Louis Railroad to install air conditioning on its passenger trains.

Notable named passenger trains
The Alton Limited
Abraham Lincoln
Ann Rutledge
The Hummer
The Midnight Special

Stations in Chicago
First entry of C&A passenger trains from Joliet into Chicago was over the Chicago & Rock Island to that railroad's depot (later La Salle Street Station). Briefly, passenger trains were moved over to the Illinois Central depot. On December 28, 1863, the leased J&C and Pittsburgh, Fort Wayne and Chicago Railway came to an agreement where the J&C would use the PFW&C's terminal at Madison Street, later becoming a tenant of Union Station, which opened in 1881. In 1924, with the completion of a new Union Station between Adams and Jackson streets, C&A became a tenant and its successors used Union Station until the takeover by Amtrak.

Company officers 
Presidents of the Alton Railroad have included:
 Timothy Blackstone 1864–1899.
 Samuel Morse Felton, Jr. 1899–1908.

References 

Railroad History Database 
PRR Chronology
Encyclopedia of the History of Missouri - Chicago & Alton Railway (1901)

External links

Alton Railroad - Pantagraph (Bloomington, IL newspaper)
 Chicago and Alton Railroad Collection – McLean Country Museum of History archives
 Steve Gossard Railroad Collection, McLean County Museum of History
 United Brotherhood of Carpenters and Joiners America archives (Local Union 377 Alton Chapter) – Special Collections and University Archives at the University of Maryland

 
Defunct Illinois railroads
Defunct Missouri railroads
Rail in Greater St. Louis
Railroads in the Chicago metropolitan area
Former Class I railroads in the United States
Defunct companies based in Chicago
American companies established in 1931
Railway companies established in 1931
Railway companies disestablished in 1947
1931 establishments in Illinois
1947 disestablishments in Illinois
Predecessors of the Gulf, Mobile and Ohio Railroad